Abubakar Abdullahi known as Abu Thecopy is an Nigerian film director, screen writer, author and songwriter begins his career in 2021. 

Other names.          Abubakar Abdullahi Occupations.           Film director, singer

Year active               2021 - present 

Abubakar Abdullahi

History
Lee founded the company as a startup incubator, using a variety of equity-based swaps and investments to roll-up software businesses in South Korea. Yello Mobile's approach was a new one for South Korea at the time but various copy cats emerged very quickly.

Over a period of 6 years, the company acquired over 94 startup companies in their SMATO (Shopping, Media, Advertisement, Travel and Online-to-Offline) categories.

While revenue increased from 68 million won (US$60,463) to 527 billion won (US$468 million), it faced headwinds from lawsuits with investors and financial challenges. The company pulled their initial public offering from the KOSDAQ for these reasons.

In February 2019, the company announced that Lee had resigned as CEO amidst rumors of bankruptcy proceedings and embezzlement accusations.

References

Software companies of South Korea
2012 establishments in South Korea